The 1951 Nippon Professional Baseball season was the second season of operation of Nippon Professional Baseball (NPB). 1951 saw the best season in terms of winning percentage in NPB history, with the Nankai Hawks going 72-24-8, good enough for a .750 winning percentage, on their way to their first Japan Series appearance in franchise history. The Yomiuri Giants would defeat the Nankai Hawks in the Japan Series 4 games to 1, marking the first of 22 Japan Series championships for the Giants.

Regular season

Standings

Postseason

Japan Series

League leaders

Central League

Pacific League

Awards
Most Valuable Player
Tetsuharu Kawakami, Yomiuri Giants (CL)
Kazuto Yamamoto, Nankai Hawks (PL)
Rookie of the Year
Kiyoshi Matsuda, Yomiuri Giants (CL)
Kazuo Kageyama, Nankai Hawks (PL)
Eiji Sawamura Award
Shigeru Sugishita, Nagoya Dragons (CL)

See also
1951 All-American Girls Professional Baseball League season
1951 Major League Baseball season

References